CIRT may refer to:

 Critical Incident Response Team, Australian police unit
 International Centre for Theatre Research, theatrical research and production company in Paris
 Controlled Impact Rescue Tool, a concrete breaching device manufactured by Raytheon
 National Chamber of the Radio and Television Industry, Mexican association of broadcasters